"No Matter What Shape (Your Stomach's In)" is an instrumental composition recorded in 1965 by The T-Bones and released as a single the same year.

Composer
The record itself lists Granville Sascha Burland as the composer, but ASCAP says the composer is Lou Bideu aka Lew Bedell.

History
In 1965, Dave Pell wanted to record songs based on music from recent TV commercials and release them on 45 RPM singles to see if he could get radio airplay and maybe a hit record.  Previously, Liberty Records had used "The T-Bones" as a group name for instrumentals recorded by Los Angeles session musicians The Wrecking Crew, and Liberty told Pell to use it again for his project.

In 1965, Pell went into the studio with members of The Wrecking Crew and recorded "No Matter What Shape (Your Stomach's In)," a song based on music used in an Alka-Seltzer TV commercial.

When the single became a hit, Liberty Records needed the T-Bones to go on the road to promote it, but the original session musicians weren't willing to go.  They were making a considerable amount of money doing sessions in Los Angeles.  So Liberty created a different "public" T-Bones group to appear on record covers, TV, and in concert. The "public" T-Bones were Judd Hamilton, Dan Hamilton, Joe Frank Carollo, Tommy Reynolds, and Gene Pello.  None of them played on the hit record but later they would achieve fame as the soft rock trio, Hamilton, Joe Frank and Reynolds.

Chart performance
The single spent 13 weeks on the Billboard Hot 100, reaching No. 3, while reaching No. 1 on Canada's RPM Play Sheet. The album spent seven weeks on Billboards chart of Top LPs, reaching No. 75.

Personnel
Dave Pell, leader
Perry Botkin, Jr., OM, arranger
Tommy Tedesco, guitar
Victor Fledman [sic], presumably Victor Feldman 
Hal Blaine, drums
Julius Wechter, percussion
Ervan Coleman,
Buddy Clark
Carol Kaye, electric bass guitar 
Lyle Ritz, upright bass
Harold "Lanky" Lindstrot, engineer
Evelyn Roberts
Martin Berman
Roger Harris, copy
Robert Ross, copy
Joe Saraceno, producer

References

1966 singles
Songs based on jingles
Pop instrumentals
1960s instrumentals